"Breakdown" is a song by American singer and songwriter Mariah Carey from her sixth studio album Butterfly (1997). The song features rap verses by two of the five members of Bone Thugs-n-Harmony. The song was released in January 1998 by Columbia Records as the third single from Butterfly. The song's lyrics describe the emotions someone feels when their lover suddenly stops loving and leaves them, and the pain, or breakdown, it caused them. Critics perceived it to be about her separation from husband Tommy Mottola, which Carey denied. The song was well received by contemporary music critics.

Carey directed the accompanying music video with previous collaborator Diane Martel. It presents Carey in various roles at a casino such as a showgirl and cabaret performer, the latter of which received comparisons to Liza Minnelli. Bone Thugs-n-Harmony, Jermaine Dupri and Redman also make appearances. "Breakdown" received heavy rotation on television channels BET and MTV and was issued as a video single. Clips accompanied Carey's live performances of the song during the Butterfly World Tour.

Aside from the music video, "Breakdown" received limited promotion from Columbia. Carey took issue with the label for a perceived longstanding anti-R&B bias against her music after it did not issue a standalone commercial single in the United States. "Breakdown" was thus ineligible to appear on the Billboard Hot 100, instead peaking at number fifty-three on the Hot 100 Airplay component chart. It was later released as a double A-side with "My All" and reached number four on Hot R&B Singles. The song's performance varied in other major music markets. It became Carey's lowest-charting single since 1991 in Australia but reached the top five in New Zealand. As of 2022, it is certified Gold in the latter country and the United States.

Background and recording 
In the early 1990s, Mariah Carey was regarded as a "studio-created bland pop diva" known for a middle of the road musical output. Eight of her songs reached number one on the US Billboard Hot 100 from 1990 to 1993, compared to three on the equivalent Hot R&B Singles chart. Stronger contemporary R&B influences became apparent after her 1993 single "Dreamlover". Carey's fifth studio album, Daydream (1995), contained some elements of hip hop music. It received the best critical reviews of her career up to that point. Coupled with separating from controlling husband Tommy Mottola, Carey felt confident to incorporate hip hop overtly in her follow-up album, Butterfly (1997). 

Carey recorded Butterfly during sessions from January to August 1997. During this time, she conceptualized a song titled "Breakdown" with Sean Combs protégé, producer Stevie J. Both men had worked on another Butterfly track, "Honey". After Carey expressed interest in collaborating with Bone Thugs-n-Harmony, they began studying the rap group's discography. In 1996, Bone Thugs-n-Harmony's single "Tha Crossroads" replaced Carey's "Always Be My Baby" at number one on the Hot 100. It spent eight weeks at the summit and tied Kris Kross's "Jump" (1992) as the rap song with the most weeks at number one. More recently, Stevie J produced The Notorious B.I.G./Bone Thugs-n-Harmony collaboration "Notorious Thugs".

According to Stevie J, composing the music for "Breakdown" was a simple process. Carey wrote her lyrics after the instrumental was complete; her vocals were on the song by the time Bone Thugs-n-Harmony members Krayzie Bone and Wish Bone came to record. She described her thought process: "I wanted to do a song in their style, so that when they came into the studio to hear it, they would know immediately that I had been totally influenced by them." Upon their arrival, Krayzie Bone and Wish Bone were provided with a platter containing Hennessy and cannabis which they passed out from after getting high. Awakened by their manager, the group members were receptive to "Breakdown" because it sounded similar to their previous work. Krayzie Bone was impressed by Carey for her knowledge of the group and described her as "very laidback and like one of the homies" during the recording process. "Breakdown" marked the first time Carey collaborated with rap artists on a song in its original form.

Music and lyrics 

Situated among ballads (e.g. "Butterfly") and uptempo songs ("Honey"), "Breakdown" occupies a musical middle ground on Butterfly. It is an R&B, hip hop, and hip hop soul song driven by a slow groove. The music was composed by Carey and Stevie J. Carey, Anthony Henderson (Krayzie Bone), and Charles Scruggs (Wish Bone) wrote the lyrics; their lead and background vocals were recorded by Dana Jon Chappelle and Ian Dalsemer at The Hit Factory and Daddy's House studios in New York City. Stevie J played keyboards and programmed additional keyboard and drum sounds electronically. After Carey, Stevie J, and Sean "Puffy" Combs produced the song, Tony Maserati conducted mixing at The Hit Factory and Herb Powers Jr. mastered it at Powers House of Sound in New York City. The album version of "Breakdown" lasts four minutes and forty-four seconds and the single version is four minutes and fifteen seconds long.

"Breakdown" posit questions regarding the end of a relationship: "So what do you do when / Somebody you’re so devoted to / Suddenly just stops loving you?" The lyrics have a dark tone yet chirping birds in the background produce an aura of optimism. Carey denied assumptions that "Breakdown" refers to her separation from Mottola, stating it is "all about the [Bone Thugs-n-Harmony] rhythmic and melodic flow that I was inspired by". The group rap in a fast-paced aggressive manner affected by reggae and doo-wop. Carey speeds up her singing as well. The fast nature of the vocals creates a contradictory emotional landscape in which Carey "ricochets between rejection and acting nonchalant". She opts for a more restrained delivery, avoiding complex acrobatics until the end of "Breakdown". Carey incorporates melisma in her vocals and produces vamps; Bone Thugs-n-Harmony harmonize their raps in staccato-saturated couplets. The song's coda consists of the phrase: "Breakdown, breakdown. Break–breakdown."

Release 
"Breakdown" is the sixth track on Butterfly, which Columbia issued on September 10, 1997. Upon the album's release, American newspapers deemed "Breakdown" a potential hit song. R&B radio stations in the country began playing it in late 1997 after a lukewarm response to album's second single, "Butterfly". After the song received 600 spins without promotion from Columbia, Carey suggested "Breakdown" would become Butterflys third single. The label released "Breakdown" to American rhythmic contemporary radio stations in January 1998.

"Breakdown" received limited promotion from Columbia; it did not issue a commercial single in the United States after the song failed to garner crossover success on contemporary hit radio. Had "Breakdown" been released to retail, the single would have broken Carey's streak of four consecutive number ones on the Hot 100. At the time, chart rules stipulated that songs required commercial releases to appear and that airplay from R&B radio stations was not a factor. In response, Carey disputed notions about her streak and said the label had a peculiar pattern of not releasing her heavy R&B material as commercial singles since Mariah Carey (1990). A writer for BET deemed "Breakdown" yet "another casualty of the Carey–Columbia feud during the Butterfly era". In 2014, Billboard described it as a "stalled" single.

Columbia later released "Breakdown" in the United States as a double A-side with the album's fifth single, "My All", on April 21, 1998. The songs were issued together in many formats: 7-inch vinyl, 12-inch vinyl, cassette, maxi cassette, CD, and maxi CD. In Japan, "Breakdown" is the B-side to the "My All" mini CD single released on May 30, 1998. It was released independently of "My All" in Oceania. Some formats include a remix of "Breakdown" with additional rapping by Bone Thugs-n-Harmony. This version, with additional contributions from Layzie Bone, also appears on the group's 1998 compilation album, The Collection. "Breakdown" is present on Carey's 2003 remix album, The Remixes, in its original form.

Reception 
"Breakdown" garnered general acclaim from music critics. David Browne from Entertainment Weekly praised the song, writing "for most of the album she keeps her notorious octave-climbing chops at bay. Showing some admirable restraint, she nestles herself into downy-soft beats. In 'Breakdown', she demonstrates she can match the staccato, lite-reggae phrasing of her guests, two members of Bone Thugs-n-Harmony." Rich Juzwiak from Slant noted its "lyrical strokes  as broad and obvious as they are naked. Mariah the chanter flawlessly adapts to their singsong style, largely boxing her multi-octave range into a sly, hypnotic melody so that when she really wails at the end, you really feel it. As with 'The Roof', Carey lunges toward musical maturity by embracing, not shunning hip-hop. This is the height of her elegance and maybe hip-hop-soul's, too."

Retrospective
Critics judge the song as a defining moment in Carey's transition to hip hop music. According to journalist Elaine Welteroth, "Breakdown" is the song that compelled African Americans to begin thinking of Carey as Black. It has been described as "one of [Carey's] greatest Hip-Hop/R&B crossovers", an "underrated masterpiece", and a "game-changing collaboration". Writers for Revolt and Complex retrospectively considered "Breakdown" among the best songs in Stevie J's production discography. In 2003, Rich Juzwiak of Slant Magazine hailed it as "the song of Carey's career".

Commercial performance 
In the United States, "Breakdown" debuted at number 66 on the Billboard Hot R&B Airplay chart dated October 18, 1997. Following its official radio release, the song peaked at number thirteen in March 1998. It also reached number eighteen on Rhythmic Top 40 the same month. Billboard originally listed Bone Thugs-n-Harmony as a featured artist, but now credits Krayzie Bone and Wish Bone individually. On the comparative Radio & Records charts, "Breakdown" peaked at numbers nine and thirteen on urban contemporary and rhythmic contemporary radio, respectively.

After the double-A side release with "My All", "Breakdown" debuted and peaked at number four on the Billboard Hot R&B Singles chart dated May 9, 1998. Sales of 25,000 units at R&B music stores accounted for 90 percent of its ranking. As the song's R&B airplay audience (6.5 million) was higher than that of the "My All" (5.2 million), the single charted as "Breakdown/My All". The songs did not appear together on the Hot 100 because "Breakdown" was not within the top seventy-five on Hot 100 Airplay at the time, having reached number fifty-three in March 1998. The Recording Industry Association of America certified "Breakdown" Gold in March 2022, which denotes 500,000 units based on digital downloads and on-demand streams.

The song's chart performance varied in other countries. "Breakdown" peaked at number four on the New Zealand singles chart, outperforming "Butterfly". It continued a pattern of success for Bone Thugs-n-Harmony in the country; five of their last six singles had peaked within the top five. The Recording Industry Association of New Zealand certified it Gold, denoting shipments of 5,000 units. In Australia, "Breakdown" reached number thirty-eight and became Carey's lowest-charting single since "I Don't Wanna Cry" in 1991. The song remains Bone Thugs-n-Harmony's most recent chart appearance in the country. Although it was not released there, the double A-side single "My All/Breakdown" appeared for one week on the UK Singles Chart at number ninety-eight.

Music video 

Carey and Diane Martel directed the accompanying music video for "Breakdown". Martel had previously directed videos for Carey's singles "Dreamlover" (1993) and "All I Want for Christmas Is You" (1994). "Breakdown" sees Carey in various roles at a Las Vegas casino. The members of Bone Thugs-n-Harmony appear, as do producer Jermaine Dupri and rapper Redman as a magician. Visuals include Carey's butterfly tattoo and her jumping into poker chips that cover a bed. In one scene performing cabaret, Carey wears a black sequin halter top on a bentwood chair. Writers for The New York Times and Ottawa Citizen felt this gave homage to Liza Minnelli as Sally Bowles in Cabaret (1972). In Gender & Society, Rana A. Emerson cited the camera's focus on Carey's revealing showgirl outfit in arguing that social standards regarding the attractiveness of female R&B singers are implied.

The "Breakdown" music video was issued in late 1997. It received heavy rotation on BET and MTV, peaking within the top five on weekly airplay charts for those television channels as measured by Broadcast Data Systems. Columbia Music Video released "Breakdown" as a video single on VHS with "My All" on April 21, 1998. It was later included on Carey's 1999 video album Around the World. The video was shown during Carey's live performances of "Breakdown" in the Butterfly World Tour so Bone Thugs-n-Harmony could appear by proxy.

Credits and personnel 
Credits adapted from the Butterfly liner notes.

 Mariah Carey – background vocals, composer, lyrics, producer, vocals
 Dana Jon Chappelle – engineering
 Sean "Puffy" Combs – producer
 Ian Dalsemer – assistant engineering
 Anthony Henderson – background vocals, lyrics, vocals
 Steven Jordan – composer, keyboards, keyboard and drum programming, producer
 Tony Maserati – mixing
 Herb Powers Jr. – mastering
 Charles Scruggs – background vocals, lyrics, vocals

Charts and certifications

Notes

References 

Books

 
 
 
 
 

1997 singles
1998 singles
Mariah Carey songs
Bone Thugs-n-Harmony songs
Music videos directed by Diane Martel
Music videos directed by Mariah Carey
Songs written by Mariah Carey
Songs written by Stevie J
1997 songs
Columbia Records singles
Sony Music singles
Songs about heartache
Songs written by Wish Bone
Songs written by Krayzie Bone
Contemporary R&B ballads
1990s ballads